Warren Perley Knowles III (August 19, 1908 – May 1, 1993) was an American lawyer and politician, and was the 36th Governor of Wisconsin.  Prior to that, he was the 32nd and 34th Lieutenant Governor of Wisconsin, and represented St. Croix, Buffalo, Pepin, and Pierce Counties in the Wisconsin Senate for fourteen years.

Early life
Knowles was born in River Falls, Wisconsin, graduated first from River Falls High School in 1926 and then Carleton College in Northfield, Minnesota, in 1930, and received a law degree from the University of Wisconsin Law School three years later.

Career
In 1933, Knowles joined the law firm now known as Doar, Drill & Skow S.C. in New Richmond, Wisconsin. From 1935 to 1964, the firm was known as Doar & Knowles. From 1935 to 1940, he served on the St. Croix County Board of Supervisors.

Knowles was first elected to the Wisconsin State Senate in 1940, becoming Majority Leader after only two years in office in 1943, but during World War II he took a break to serve as a lieutenant in the U.S. Navy aboard the USS Nevada. Following his military service, Knowles resumed serving in the Wisconsin State Senate and returned to the leadership position for 5 additional legislative terms until his election as lieutenant governor in 1954.  Knowles resigned his Senate seat and was succeeded by his brother, Robert, who won an April 1955 special election to finish the unexpired senate term.

Knowles was also a delegate to the Republican National Convention several times.

Knowles would be re-elected to a second term as lieutenant governor in 1956, but was narrowly defeated in 1958 by Democrat Philleo Nash.  But Knowles would return and defeat Nash in the 1960 election to reclaim the office for one more term.

During his second term as lieutenant governor, he entered the crowded field for the special election for the remainder of Sen. Joseph McCarthy's term upon his death in 1957. He placed fourth behind former Governor Walter J. Kohler Jr. and Congressmen Glenn R. Davis and Alvin O'Konski, receiving 8% of the vote.

Elected governor narrowly over the Democratic incumbent John W. Reynolds in 1964 against the national Lyndon B. Johnson tidal wave, he served three two-year terms from 1965 to 1971. During these years, he called out the National Guard periodically to maintain civil order during the University of Wisconsin's anti-war and civil rights demonstrations.

Knowles's brother, Robert P. Knowles, served as President Pro Tempore of the Wisconsin Senate during his last two terms as governor and during the first four years of Governor Patrick Lucey's administration from 1971 to 1975.

After leaving the governor's chair, Knowles became chairman of Heritage Wisconsin Corporation, a Milwaukee bank holding company.

Personal life
Son of Warren P. and Anna D. Knowles, Knowles was a 1926 graduate of River Falls High School (side note Warren P. Knowles Sr., was an 1897 graduate of RFHS). During his high school days Knowles was a standout athlete both on the football field and basketball court. During his senior year of high school, his team won the 1925 Wisconsin State Football Championship and placed second in the Wisconsin State Basketball Tournament losing to Stevens Point in the lowest scoring championship game in the State's history, 9–7. He was recognized in the River Falls Wildcat Athletic Hall of Fame with a Distinguish Citizen Award.

In 1943 he married Dorothy Guidry, whom he later divorced in 1968.

Knowles died after suffering a heart attack while participating in the Governor's Fishing Opener, an event he helped organize 25 years earlier. His body was donated to the Medical College of Wisconsin.

Honors 
Wisconsin's Stewardship Fund, created "to preserve valuable wildlife habitat and natural areas, protect water quality and fisheries, and expand opportunities for outdoor recreation" was renamed the Warren Knowles-Gaylord Nelson Stewardship Program in 1993. In 1994, Knowles was inducted into the Wisconsin Conservation Hall of Fame.

References

External links
 

1908 births
1993 deaths
County supervisors in Wisconsin
Republican Party governors of Wisconsin
Lieutenant Governors of Wisconsin
Republican Party Wisconsin state senators
20th-century American naval officers
United States Navy personnel of World War II
People from River Falls, Wisconsin
University of Wisconsin Law School alumni
Military personnel from Wisconsin
Wisconsin lawyers
20th-century American politicians
Carleton College alumni
People from New Richmond, Wisconsin
20th-century American lawyers